This is a select bibliography of English language books (including translations) and journal articles about the history of Poland during World War II. A brief selection of English translations of primary sources is included. Book entries have references to journal articles and reviews about them when helpful.   Additional bibliographies can be found in many of the book-length works listed below; see Further Reading for several book and chapter-length bibliographies. The External Links section contains entries for publicly available select bibliographies from universities. This bibliography specifically excludes non-history related works and self-published books.

For works about the overall history of Poland, please see Bibliography of the history of Poland.

Inclusion criteria
Geographic scope of the works include Poland as it was in 1939 including Polish occupied Trans-Olza and the Holocaust in Poland. Works about other nations are included when they contain substantial material related to the history of the Poland during World War II.

Included works should either be published by an academic or notable publisher, or be authored by a notable subject matter expert and have reviews in significant scholarly journals. 

Formatting and citation style
This bibliography uses APA style citations. Entries do not use templates; references to reviews and notes for entries do use citation templates. Where books which are only partially related to the history of Poland are listed, the titles for chapters or sections should be indicated if possible, meaningful, and not excessive.

If a work has been translated into English, the translator should be included and a footnote with appropriate bibliographic information for the original language version should be included.

When listing book titles with alternative English spellings, the form used in the latest published version should be used and the version and relevant bibliographic information noted if it previously was published or reviewed under a different title.

General surveys

 Davies, N. (2007). No Simple Victory: World War II in Europe, 1939-1945. New York: Viking.
 Furber, D. (2004). Near As Far in the Colonies: The Nazi Occupation of Poland. The International History Review, 26(3), 541–579. 
 Garliński, J. (1985). Poland in the Second World War. New York: Palgrave Macmillan.
 Gross, J. T. (2019). Polish Society Under German Occupation: The Generalgouvernement, 1939-1944 (Princeton Legacy Library). Princeton: Princeton University Press.
 Kochanski, H. (2012). The Eagle Unbowed: Poland and the Poles in the Second World War. Cambridge: Harvard University Press.
 McGilvray, E. (2019). Poland and the Second World War, 1938–1948. Barnsley: Pen & Sword Military.
 Paczkowski, A. (2003). The Spring Will Be Ours: Poland and the Poles from Occupation to Freedom (J. Cave, Trans.). University Park: Pennsylvania State University Press.
 Rawson, A. (2019). Poland's Struggle: Before, During and After the Second World War. Barnsley: Pen and Sword Military.

Regional surveys
 Bergen, D. L. (2005). Tenuousness and Tenacity: The Volksdeutschen of Eastern Europe, World War II, and the Holocaust. In K. O'Donnell, R. Bridenthal, & N. Reagin (Eds.), The Heimat Abroad: The Boundaries of Germanness (pp. 267–286). University of Michigan Press. 
 Mazower, M. (2008). Hitler's Empire. Nazi Rule in Occupied Europe. New York: Penguin.
 Pinchuk, B. C. (1978). The Sovietization of the Jewish Community of Eastern Poland 1939-1941. Slavonic and East European Review, 56(3), 387–410. 
 Prażmowska, A. J. (2000). Eastern Europe and the Origins of the Second World War. New York: Red Globe Press.
 Ther, P., & Siljak, A. (Eds.). (2001). Redrawing Nations: Ethnic Cleansing in East-Central Europe, 1944–1948 (The Harvard Cold War Studies Book). Lanham: Rowman & Littlefield Publishers.

Military
 Davies, N. (2015). Trail of Hope: The Anders Army, An Odyssey Across Three Continents. Oxford: Osprey Publishing.
 Drzewieniecki, W. M. (1981). The Polish Army on the Eve of World War II. The Polish Review, 26(3), 54–64. 
 Forczyk, R. (2019). Case White: The Invasion of Poland 1939. Oxford: Osprey Publishing.
 Gross, J. (2002). Revolution from Abroad: The Soviet Conquest of Poland's Western Ukraine and Western Belorussia. Princeton: Princeton University Press, 1988; Expanded Edition.
 Koskodan, K. K. (2009). No Greater Ally: The Untold Story of Poland's Forces in World War II. Oxford: Osprey Publishing.
 McGilvray, E. (2022). First Polish Armoured Division 1938-47: A History. Barnsley: Pen and Sword Military.
 Murphy-Gemmill, L. M. (2017). "Poland Is Not Yet Lost": The Tadeusz Kościuszko Polish Armed Unit in Canada 1941–1942. The Polish Review, 62(4), 67–84. 
 Peszke, M. A. (1980). A Synopsis of Polish-Allied Military Agreements during World War Two. Military Affairs, 44(3), 128–134. 
 Peszke, M. A. (1981). The Polish Armed Forces in Exile: Part I. September 1939-July 1941. The Polish Review, 26(1), 67–113. 
 Peszke, M. A. (1984). The Polish Parachute Brigade in World War Two: A Paradigm for the Polish Military in Exile. Military Affairs, 48(4), 188–193. 
 Peszke, M. A. (1987). The Polish Armed Forces in Exile: Part 2 July 1941—May 1945. The Polish Review, 32(1), 33–69. 
 Peszke, M. A. (1988). The Polish Government's Aid to and Liaison with Its Secret Army in Occupied Poland, 1939-1945. Military Affairs, 52(4), 197–202. 
 Peszke, M. A. (1994). The Forgotten Campaign: Poland's Military Aviation in September, 1939. The Polish Review, 39(1), 51–72. 
 Peszke, M. A. (2016). Poland's Military Aviation, September 1939: It Never Had a Chance. In R. Higham & S. J. Harris (Eds.), Why Air Forces Fail: The Anatomy of Defeat (2nd Ed., pp. 13–40). University Press of Kentucky. 
 Sword, K. (Ed). (1991). The Soviet Takeover of the Polish Eastern Provinces, 1939–41. (Studies in Russia and East Europe). New York: Palgrave Macmillan.
 Toczewski, A. (1992). Cooperation Between the Soviet Union and the Third Reich in Exchanges of Polish Population and Prisoners of War in the Years 1939-1941. The Polish Review, 37(2), 209–215. 
 Williamson, D. G. (2009). Poland Betrayed: The Nazi-Soviet Invasions of 1939. Barnsley: Pen and Sword Military.
 Zamoyski, A. (1995). The Forgotten Few: The Polish Air Force in the Second World War. New York: Hippocrene Books.

War crimes
For works about the Holocaust, please see #Holocaust in Poland.
 Cienciala, A. M., Lebedeva, N. S., & Materski, W. (Eds.). (2008). Katyn: A Crime Without Punishment. New Haven: Yale University Press.
 Mędykowski, W. W. (2018). Macht Arbeit Frei?: German Economic Policy and Forced Labor of Jews in the General Government, 1939-1943. Academic Studies Press. 
 Tuszynski, M., & Denda, D. F. (1999). Soviet War Crimes Against Poland During The Second World War And Its Aftermath: A Review Of The Factual Record And Outstanding Questions. The Polish Review, 44(2), 183–216.
 Paul, A. (2010). Katyn: Stalin's Massacre and the Triumph of Truth. DeKalb: Northern Illinois University Press.
 Snyder, T. (1999). To Resolve the Ukrainian Problem Once and for All: The Ethnic Cleansing of Ukrainians in Poland, 1943–1947. Journal of Cold War Studies, 1(2), 86–120.
 Snyder, T. (2003). The Causes of Ukrainian-Polish Ethnic Cleansing 1943. Past & Present, 179, 197–234. 
 Tuszynski, M., & Denda, D. F. (1999). Soviet War Crimes Against Poland during the Second World War and Its Aftermath: A Review of the Factual Record and Outstanding Questions. The Polish Review, 44(2), 183–216. 
 Urban, T. (2020). The Katyn Massacre 1940: History of a Crime. Barnsley: Pen and Sword Military.
 Wheatcroft, S. G. (1996). The Scale and Nature of German and Soviet Repression and Mass Killings, 1930-45. Europe-Asia Studies, 48(8), 1319–1353. 
 Wheatcroft, S. G. (2000). The Scale and Nature of Stalinist Repression and Its Demographic Significance: On Comments by Keep and Conquest. Europe-Asia Studies, 52(6), 1143–1159. 
 Wierzbicki, M., & Rosenson, C. (2007). Polish–Jewish Relations in Vilna and the Region of Western Vilna under Soviet Occupation, 1939-1941. In M. B. Biskupski & A. Polonsky (Eds.), Polin: Studies in Polish Jewry Volume 19: Polish-Jewish Relations in North America (pp. 487–516). Liverpool University Press. 
 Wróbel, P. J. (2014). Class War or Ethnic Cleansing? Soviet Deportations of Polish Citizens from the Eastern Provinces of Poland, 1939–1941. The Polish Review, 59(2), 19–42. 
 Zamojski, J. E. (2001). The Social History of Polish Exile (1939–1945).: The Exile State and the Clandestine State: Society, Problems and Reflections. In M. Conway & J. Gotovitch (Eds.), Europe in Exile: European Exile Communities in Britain 1940-45 (1st Ed., pp. 183–212). Berghahn Books.

Social
 Gross, J. (2019). Polish Society Under German Occupation: The Generalgouvernement, 1939-1944 (Princeton Legacy Library). Princeton: Princeton University Press.
 Gross, J. (2001). Neighbors: The Destruction of the Jewish Community in Jedwabne, Poland. Princeton: Princeton University Press.
 Piotrowski, T. (1997). Poland's Holocaust: Ethnic Strife, Collaboration with Occupying Forces and Genocide in the Second Republic, 1918-1947. Jefferson: McFarland & Company.
 Röger, M., & Ward, R. (2021). Wartime Relations: Intimacy, Violence, and Prostitution in Occupied Poland, 1939-1945. Oxford: Oxford University Press.
 Sword, K. (1994). Deportation and Exile: Poles in the Soviet Union, 1939–48. New York: Palgrave Macmillan.
 Zamojski, J. E. (2001). The Social History of Polish Exile (1939–1945): The Exile State and the Clandestine State: Society, Problems and Reflections. In M. Conway & J. Gotovitch (Eds.)., Europe in Exile: European Exile Communities in Britain 1940-45 (1st ed., pp. 183–212). London: Berghahn Books.

Location histories
 Mick, C. (2011). Incompatible Experiences: Poles, Ukrainians and Jews in Lviv under Soviet and German Occupation, 1939-44. Journal of Contemporary History, 46(2), 336–363.

General Government
 Under construction

Topical
 Cienciala, A. M. (1988). The Question of the Polish-Soviet Frontier in 1939–1940: the Litauer Memorandum and Sikorski's Proposals for Re-Establishing Polish-Soviet Relations. The Polish Review 33(3), 295–323. 
 Grzebalkowska, M. (2020). Poland 1945: War and Peace (J. Markoff & M. Markoff, Trans.). Pittsburgh: University of Pittsburgh Press.
 Markiewicz, P. (2021). Unlikely Allies: Nazi German and Ukrainian Nationalist Collaboration in the General Government During World War II. West Lafayette: Purdue University Press.
 Moorhouse, R. (2020). Poland 1939: The Outbreak of World War II. New York: Basic Books.
 Pinchuk, B.-C. (1986). Cultural Sovietization in a Multi-Ethnic Environment: Jewish Culture in Soviet Poland, 1939-1941. Jewish Social Studies, 48(2), 163–174. 

Collaboration
 Blum, A., Chopard, T., & Koustova, E. (2020). Survivors, Collaborators and Partisans?: Bringing Jewish Ghetto Policemen Before Soviet Justice in Lithuania. Jahrbücher Für Geschichte Osteuropa's, 68(2), 222–255. 
 Connelly, J. (2005). Why the Poles Collaborated So Little: and Why That is No Reason for Nationalist Hubris.  Slavic Review, 64(4), 771–781. 
 Dean, M. (2005). Where Did All The Collaborators Go? Slavic Review, 64(4), 791–798. 
 Dean, M. (2007). Poles in the German Local Police in Eastern Poland and Their Role in the Holocaust. In C. Freeze, P. Hyman, & A. Polonsky (Eds.), Polin: Studies in Polish Jewry Volume 18: Jewish Women in Eastern Europe (pp. 353–366). Liverpool University Press. 
 Finder, G. N., & Prusin, A. V. (2008). Jewish Collaborators on Trial in Poland 1944–1956. In G. N. Finder, N. Aleksiun, A. Polonsky, & J. Schwarz (Eds.), Polin: Studies in Polish Jewry Volume 20: Making Holocaust Memory (pp. 122–148). Liverpool University Press. 
 Friedrich, K.-P. (2005). Collaboration in a "Land Without a Quisling": Patterns of Cooperation with the Nazi German Occupation Regime in Poland during World War II. Slavic Review, 64(4), 711–746. 

Trials and reprisals
 Finder, G. N., & Prusin, A. V. (2018). Justice Behind the Iron Curtain: Nazis on Trial in Communist Poland. University of Toronto Press. 

Underground and resistance
 Armstrong, J. A. (1994). The Polish Underground and the Jews: A Reassessment of Home Army Commander Tadeusz Bór-Komorowski's Order 116 Against Banditry. Slavonic and East European Review, 72(2), 259–276. 
 Garlinski, J. (1975). The Polish Underground State (1939-45). Journal of Contemporary History, 10(2), 219–259. 
 Korboński, S. (1978). The Polish Underground State, 1939–1945. Boulder: East European Monographs.
 Kochanski, H. (2022). Resistance: The Underground War Against Hitler, 1939-1945. New York: W. W. Norton & Company.
 Nowożycki, B. (2016). Soldiers of the Home Army Group "Radosław" after the Fall of the Warsaw Uprising and the End of World War II. The Polish Review, 61(2), 45–65. 
 Reynolds, J. (1981). "Lublin" Versus "London" - The Party and the Underground Movement in Poland, 1944-1945. Journal of Contemporary History, 16(4), 617–648. 

Warsaw Uprising
 Chmielarz, A., & Kapolka, G. T. (1994). Warsaw Fought Alone: Reflections on Aid to and the Fall of the 1944 Uprising. The Polish Review, 39(4), 415–433. 
 Ciechanowski, J. (2010). The Warsaw Rising of 1944 (Cambridge Russian, Soviet and Post-Soviet Studies). Cambridge: Cambridge University Press.
 Davies, N. (2003). Rising ’44: The Battle For Warsaw. London: Macmillan.
 Lukas, R. C. (1975). The Big Three and the Warsaw Uprising. Military Affairs, 39(3), 129–135. 
 Lukas, R. C. (1975). The RAF and the Warsaw Uprising. Aerospace Historian, 22(4), 188–194. 
 Richie, A. (2013). Warsaw 1944: Hitler, Himmler, and the Warsaw Uprising. New York: Farrar, Straus and Giroux.
 Lichten, J. L. (1968). The Uprising of the Warsaw Ghetto: The Legend of Yesterday and the Reality of Today. The Polish Review, 13(2), 47–57. 

Émigrés and refugees
 Habielski, R. (2010). Democratic Thought and Action Among the Polish Political Émigrés, 1939–89. In M. B. B. Biskupski, J. S. Pula, & P. J. Wróbel (Eds.), The Origins of Modern Polish Democracy (1st Ed., pp. 190–213). Ohio University Press. 
 Hilton, L. (2009). Cultural Nationalism in Exile: The Case of Polish and Latvian Displaced Persons. The Historian, 71(2), 280–317. 

Foreign relations
 Biskupski, M. B. (1999). Canada and the Creation of a Polish Army, 1914-1918. The Polish Review, 44(3), 339–380. 
 Cienciala, A. M. (1994). The Diplomatic Background Of The Warsaw Uprising Of 1944: The Players And The Stakes. The Polish Review, 39(4), 393–413. 
 Cienciala, A. M. (2001). The Polish Government's Policy On the Polish-Soviet Frontier in World War II as Viewed by American, British and Canadian Historians. The Polish Review, 46(1), 3–26.
 Lukas, R. C. (1975). The Big Three and the Warsaw Uprising. Military Affairs, 39(3), 129–135. 
 Peszke, M. A. (1980). A Synopsis of Polish-Allied Military Agreements during World War Two. Military Affairs, 44(3), 128–134. 
 Prazmowska, A. J. (1986). Poland's Foreign Policy: September 1938 - September 1939. The Historical Journal, 29(4), 853–873. 
 Sharp, T. (1977). The Origins of the "Teheran Formula" on Polish Frontiers. Journal of Contemporary History, 12(2), 381–393. 

Government in exile
 Coutouvidis, J. (1984). Lewis Namier and the Polish Government-in-Exile, 1939-40. The Slavonic and East European Review, 62(3), 421–428.
 Korga, I. D. (2007). The Information Policy of the Polish Government-in-Exile Toward the American Public During World War II. Polish American Studies, 64(1), 27–45.
 Peszke, M. A. (1988). The Polish Government's Aid to and Liaison with Its Secret Army in Occupied Poland, 1939-1945. Military Affairs, 52(4), 197–202. 
 Prazmowska, A. J. (2013). Anticipation of Civil War: The Polish Government in Exile and the Threat Posed by the Communist Movement During the Second World War. Journal of Contemporary History, 48(4), 717–741. 
 Reynolds, J. (1981). "Lublin" Versus "London" - The Party and the Underground Movement in Poland, 1944-1945. Journal of Contemporary History, 16(4), 617–648. 
 Schwonek, M. R. (2006). Kazimierz Sosnkowski as Commander in Chief: The Government-in-Exile and Polish Strategy, 1943-1944. The Journal of Military History, 70(3), 743–780.

American-Polish relations
 Biskupski, M. B. B. (2002). Hollywood and Poland, 1939-1945: The American Cinema And The Poles During World War II. The Polish Review, 47(2), 183–210. 
 Cienciala, A. M. (2009). The United States and Poland in World War II. The Polish Review, 54(2), 173–194.
 Cienciala, A. M. (2009). The United States and Poland in World War II. The Polish Review, 54(2), 173–194. 
 Fels, B. E. (2003). "Whatever Your Heart Dictates and Your Pocket Permits": Polish-American Aid to Polish Refugees during World War II. Journal of American Ethnic History, 22(2), 3–30. 
 Januszewski, D. G. (1986). The Case for the Polish Exile Government in the American Press, 1939-1945. Polish American Studies, 43(1), 57–97.
 Korga, I. D. (2007). The Information Policy of the Polish Government-In-Exile Toward the American Public during World War II. Polish American Studies, 64(1), 27–45. 
 Larsh, W. (1995). Yalta and the American Approach to Free Elections in Poland. The Polish Review, 40(3), 267–280.
 Szymczak, R. (1999). Uneasy Observers: The OSS Foreign Nationalities Branch and Perceptions of Polish Nationalism in the United States During World War II. Polish American Studies, 56(1), 7–73.

British-Polish relations
 Cienciala, A. M. (1995). Great Britain And Poland Before And After Yalta (1943-1945): A Reassessment. The Polish Review, 40(3), 281–313. 
 Lukas, R. C. (1975). The RAF and the Warsaw Uprising. Aerospace Historian, 22(4), 188–194. 
 Nocon, A. (1996). A Reluctant Welcome? Poles in Britain in the 1940s. Oral History, 24(1), 79–87. 
 Prazmowska, A. (2009). Britain, Poland and the Eastern Front, 1939 (Cambridge Russian, Soviet and Post-Soviet Studies). Cambridge: Cambridge University Press.
 Prazmowska, A. (2009). Britain and Poland 1939-1943: The Betrayed Ally (Cambridge Russian, Soviet and Post-Soviet Studies). Cambridge: Cambridge University Press.
 Stirling, T., Nalęcz, D., & Dubicki, T. (Eds.). (2005). Intelligence Co-Operation Between Poland and Great Britain During World War II: The Report Of The Anglo-Polish Historical Committee (Government Official History Series). London: Vallentine Mitchell.
 Strang, G. B. (1996). Once More unto the Breach: Britain's Guarantee to Poland, March 1939. Journal of Contemporary History, 31(4), 721–752. 
 Sword, K., Davies, N., & Ciechanowski, J. (1989). The Formation of the Polish Community in Great Britain, 1939–1950. London: University of London.
 Sword, K. (1991). British Reactions to the Soviet Occupation of Eastern Poland in September 1939. The Slavonic and East European Review, 69(1), 81–101. 

German-Polish relations
 Halloway, R. (2021). Germany, Poland, and the Danzig Question, 1937–1939. London: Hamilton Books.
 Huener, J. (2014). Nazi Kirchenpolitik and Polish Catholicism in the Reichsgau Wartheland, 1939-1941. Central European History, 47(1), 105–137. 
 Weinberg, G. L. (1975). German Foreign Policy and Poland, 1937-38. The Polish Review, 20(1), 5–23. 

Soviet-Polish relations
 Cienciala, A. M. (1985). The Activities of Polish Communists as a Source for Stalin's Policy Towards Poland in the Second World War. The International History Review, 7(1), 129–145. 
 Cienciala, A. M. (1988). The Question of the Polish-Soviet Frontier in 1939–1940 (The Litauer Memorandum and Sikorski's Proposals for Re-Establishing Polish-Soviet Relations). The Polish Review, 33(3), 295–323.
 Cienciala, A. M. (1996). General Sikorski And The Conclusion Of The Polish-Soviet Agreement Of July 30, 1941: A Reassessment. The Polish Review, 41(4), 401–434. 
 Kaczorowska, T. (2022). The Augustow Roundup of July 1945: Accounts of the Brutal Soviet Repression of Polish Resistance (B. U. Zaremba, Ed.; H. Koralewski, Trans.). Jefferson: McFarland & Company.
 Moorhouse, R. (2014). The Devils’ Alliance. Hitler's Pact with Stalin, 1939–1941. New York: Basic Books.
 Orzell, L. (1976). Poland and Russia, July 1941-April 1943: The "Impossible" Alliance. The Polish Review, 21(4), 35–58. 
 Pinchuk, B. C. (1978). The Sovietization of the Jewish Community of Eastern Poland 1939-1941. Slavonic and East European Review, 56(3), 387–410. 
 Raack, R. C. (1990). Stalin Fixes the Oder-Neisse Line. Journal of Contemporary History, 25(4), 467–488. 
 Raack, R. C. (1991). Stalin's Plans for World War II. Journal of Contemporary History, 26(2), 215–227. 
 Raack, R. C. (1993). Stalin Plans His Post-War Germany. Journal of Contemporary History, 28(1), 53–73. 
 Reynolds, D. (2002). From World War to Cold War: The Wartime Alliance and Post-War Transitions, 1941-1947. The Historical Journal, 45(1), 211–227. 
 Roberts, G. (2006). Stalin's Wars: From World War to Cold War, 1939-1953. Yale University Press. 
 Rotfeld, A. D., & Torkunov, A. V. (Eds.). (2015). White Spots—Black Spots: Difficult Matters in Polish-Russian Relations, 1918–2008. University of Pittsburgh Press. 
 Sanford, G. (2006). The Katyn Massacre and Polish-Soviet Relations, 1941-43. Journal of Contemporary History, 41(1), 95–111. 

Other works
 Kornat, M. (2009). Choosing Not to Choose in 1939: Poland's Assessment of the Nazi-Soviet Pact. The International History Review, 31(4), 771–797. 
 Tighe, C. (1996). The Polish Writing Profession: 1944-56. Contemporary European History, 5(1), 71–101. 

Biographies
This section is about Poles of all backgrounds and beliefs and victims of the Holocaust in Poland.
 Biskupski, M. B. (1998). Spy, Patriot or Internationalist? The Early Career of Józef Retinger, Polish Patriarch of European Union. The Polish Review, 43(1), 23–67.

Historiography and memory studies
 Crowley, D. (2011). Memory in Pieces: The Symbolism of the Ruin in Warsaw after 1944. Journal of Modern European History 9(3), 351–372. 
 Jażborowska, I. (2008). Russian Historical Writing About The Crime Of Katyn. The Polish Review, 53(2), 139–157. 
 Kassow, S. D. (2018). Who Will Write Our History?: Emanuel Ringelblum, the Warsaw Ghetto, and the Oyneg Shabes Archive (The Helen and Martin Schwartz Lectures in Jewish Studies). Bloomington: Indiana University Press.
 Madajczyk, P. (2013). Experience and Memory: The Second World War in Poland. In J. Echternkamp & S. Martens (Eds.), Experience and Memory: The Second World War in Europe. New York: Berghahn Books. 
 Muller, A., & Logemann, D. (2017). War, Dialogue, and Overcoming the Past: The Second World War Museum in Gdansk, Poland. The Public Historian, 39(3), 85–95.
 Paul, A. (2010). Katyn: Stalin's Massacre and the Triumph of Truth. DeKalb: Northern Illinois University Press.
 Steffen, K., & Güttel, A. (2008). Disputed Memory: Jewish Past, Polish Remembrance. Osteuropa, 58(8/10), 199–217. 
 Szymczak, R. (2008). The Vindication of Memory: The Katyn Case in the West, Poland, and Russia, 1952-2008. The Polish Review, 53(4), 419–443. 
 Wawrzyniak, J., & Lewis, S. (2015). Veterans, Victims, and Memory: The Politics of the Second World War In Communist Poland (New Edition). Peter Lang. 

Holocaust in Poland
 Browning, C. (1992). Ordinary Men: Reserve Police Battalion 101 and the Final Solution in Poland. New York: HarperCollins.
 Dean, M. (2005). Where Did All The Collaborators Go? Slavic Review, 64(4), 791–798. 
 Dean, M. (2007). Poles in the German Local Police in Eastern Poland and Their Role in the Holocaust. In C. Freeze, P. Hyman, & A. Polonsky (Eds.), Polin: Studies in Polish Jewry Volume 18: Jewish Women in Eastern Europe (pp. 353–366). Liverpool University Press. 
 Engel, D. (1983). An Early Account of Polish Jewry Under Nazi and Soviet Occupation Presented to the Polish Government-in-Exile, February 1940. Jewish Social Studies, 45(1), 1–16.
 Engel, D. (2021). The Holocaust: The Third Reich and the Jews. London: Routledge.
 Friedman, J. C. (Ed.). (2010). The Routledge History of the Holocaust. London: Routledge.
 Gigliotti, S. (2010). The Train Journey: Transit, Captivity, and Witnessing in the Holocaust. New York: Berghahn Books.
 Gilbert, M. (1986). The Holocaust: The Human Tragedy. New York: Henry Holt & Co.
 Haltof, M. (2012). Polish Film and the Holocaust: Politics and Memory. Berghahn Books.
 Henry, P. (Ed.). (2014). Jewish Resistance Against the Nazis. Catholic University of America Press. 
 Kay, A. J. (2021). Empire of Destruction: A History of Nazi Mass Killing. New Haven: Yale University Press.
 Kornbluth, A. (2021). The August Trials: The Holocaust and Postwar Justice in Poland. Cambridge: Harvard University Press.
 Lucas, R. C. (1990). Forgotten Holocaust: The Poles under German Occupation 1939–1944. New York: Hippocrene Books.
 Mędykowski, W. W. (2018). Macht Arbeit Frei?: German Economic Policy and Forced Labor of Jews in the General Government, 1939-1943. Academic Studies Press. 
 Nasierowski, T. (2006). In the Abyss of Death: The Extermination of the Mentally Ill in Poland During World War II. International Journal of Mental Health, 35(3), 50–61. 
 Skibińska, A., Szurek, J.-C., Zapalec, A., Panz, K., Frydel, T., & Swałtek-Niewińska, D. (2022). Night without End: The Fate of Jews in German-Occupied Poland (J. Grabowski & B. Engelking, Eds.). Bloomington: Indiana University Press.

Location histories
 Baxter, I. (2021). The Ghettos of Nazi-Occupied Poland: Rare Photographs from Wartime Archives. Barnsley: Pen & Sword Military.
 Blatman, D. (2006). The Encounter between Jews and Poles in Lublin District after Liberation, 1944-1945. East European Politics and Societies, 20(4), 598–621. 
 Kershaw, I. (1992). Improvised Genocide? The Emergence of the "Final Solution" in the "Warthegau." Transactions of the Royal Historical Society, 2, 51–78. 
 Naimark, N. M. (2002). The Nazis and “The East”: Jedwabne's Circle of Hell. Slavic Review, 61(3), 476–482. 
 Nowak, J., & Brzezinski, Z. (1982). Courier from Warsaw. Detroit: Wayne State University Press.
 Paulsson, G. S. (2003). Secret City: The Hidden Jews of Warsaw, 1940-1945. New Haven: Yale University Press.
 Wierzbicki, M., & Rosenson, C. (2007). Polish–Jewish Relations in Vilna and the Region of Western Vilna under Soviet Occupation, 1939-1941. In M. B. Biskupski & A. Polonsky (Eds.), Polin: Studies in Polish Jewry Volume 19: Polish-Jewish Relations in North America (pp. 487–516). Liverpool University Press. 

Geography
 Barnes, T. J., & Minca, C. (2013). Nazi Spatial Theory: The Dark Geographies of Carl Schmitt and Walter Christaller. Annals of the Association of American Geographers, 103(3), 669–687. 
 Beorn, W., Cole, T., Gigliotti, S., Giordano, A., Holian, A., Jaskot, P. B., Knowles, A. K., Masurovsky, M., & Steiner, E. B. (2009). Geographies of the Holocaust. Geographical Review, 99(4), 563–574. 
 Steiner, E. B. (2014). Geographies of the Holocaust (A. K. Knowles, T. Cole, & A. Giordano, Eds.). Bloomington: Indiana University Press. 

Ghettos
 Adelson, A. & R. L. (1989). Łódź Ghetto: Inside a Community Under Siege. New York: Viking Press.
 Blum, A., Chopard, T., & Koustova, E. (2020). Survivors, Collaborators and Partisans?: Bringing Jewish Ghetto Policemen Before Soviet Justice in Lithuania. Jahrbücher Für Geschichte Osteuropa's, 68(2), 222–255. 
 Einwohner, R. L. (2009). The Need to Know: Cultured Ignorance and Jewish Resistance in the Ghettos of Warsaw, Vilna, and Łódź. The Sociological Quarterly, 50(3), 407–430. 
 Lisner, W. (2020). Midwifery under German Occupation in the Litzmannstadt Ghetto and in Western Poland. Nashim: A Journal of Jewish Women's Studies & Gender Issues, 36, 86–116. 
 Sierakowiak, D. (2013). Notebooks from the Łódź Ghetto (1942). In A. Rabinbach & S. L. Gilman (Eds.), The Third Reich Sourcebook''' (1st ed., pp. 775–776). Berkeley: University of California Press. 
 Sznapman, S. (2013). Warsaw Ghetto Diary (1943). In A. Rabinbach & S. L. Gilman (Eds.), The Third Reich Sourcebook (1st ed., pp. 776–778). Berkeley: University of California Press.
 Tiedens, L. Z. (1997). Optimism and Revolt of the Oppressed: A Comparison of Two Polish Jewish Ghettos of World War II. Political Psychology, 18(1), 45–69. 

Camps
 Arad, Y. (1987). Belzec, Sobibor, Treblinka: The Operation Reinhard Death Camps. Bloomington: Indiana University Press. 
 Garlinski, J., Polonsky, A., & Foot, M. R. D. (2018). Fighting Auschwitz: The Resistance Movement in the Concentration Camp. Los Angeles: Aquila Polonica.

Transportation
 Under construction

Gender and family
 Lisner, W. (2020). Midwifery under German Occupation in the Litzmannstadt Ghetto and in Western Poland. Nashim: A Journal of Jewish Women's Studies & Gender Issues, 36, 86–116. 

Holocaust related biographies
  Under construction

Other studies
 Grodin, M. A. (Ed.). (2014). Jewish Medical Resistance in the Holocaust. New York: Berghahn Books.

Holocaust historiography and memory studies

 Feierstein, D., & Town, D. A. (2014). Discourse and Politics in Holocaust Studies: Uniqueness, Comparability, and Narration. In Genocide as Social Practice: Reorganizing Society under the Nazis and Argentina's Military Juntas (pp. 71–86). Rutgers University Press. 
 Hirsch, M., & Spitzer, L. (2010). The Witness in the Archive: Holocaust Studies/Memory Studies. In S. Radstone & B. Schwarz (Eds.), Memory: Histories, Theories, Debates (pp. 390–405). Fordham University Press.
 Hudzik, J. P. (2020). Reflections on German and Polish Historical Policies of Holocaust Memory. The Polish Review, 65(4), 36–59.
 Kucia, M. (2015). Auschwitz in the Perception of Contemporary Poles. Polish Sociological Review, 190, 191–206. 
 LaCapra, D. (1994). Representing the Holocaust: History, Theory, Trauma. Cornell University Press.
 Libowitz, R. (1990). Holocaust Studies. Modern Judaism, 10(3), 271–281. 
 Littell, F. H. (1980). Fundamentals in Holocaust Studies. The Annals of the American Academy of Political and Social Science, 450, 213–217.
 Michman, D. (2018). Historiography on the Holocaust in Poland: An Outsider's View of its Place within Recent General Developments in Holocaust Historiography. In A. Polonsky, H. Węgrzynek, & A. Żbikowski (Eds.), New Directions in the History of the Jews in the Polish Lands (pp. 386–401). New York: Academic Studies Press.
 Rittner, C., & Roth, J. K. (2020). Advancing Holocaust Studies. London: Routledge.

Memory studies
 Haltof, M. (2012). Polish Film and the Holocaust: Politics and Memory. Berghahn Books.
 Kapralski, S. (2017). Jews and the Holocaust in Poland's Memoryscapes: an Inquiry Into Transcultural Amnesia. In T. S. Andersen & B. Törnquist-Plewa (Eds.), The Twentieth Century in European Memory (pp. 170–197). Leiden: Brill. 
 Langenbacher, E. (2010). Collective Memory and German–Polish Relations. In E. Langenbacher & Y. Shain (Eds.), Power and the Past: Collective Memory and International Relations (pp. 71–96). Georgetown University Press. 
 Steffen, K., & Güttel, A. (2008). Disputed Memory: Jewish Past, Polish Remembrance. Osteuropa, 58(8/10), 199–217.

Other
 Bergen, D. L. (2008). Instrumentalization of Volksdeutschen in German Propaganda in 1939: Replacing/Erasing Poles, Jews, and Other Victims. German Studies Review, 31(3), 447–470.
 Bilska-Wodecka, E., Jackowski, A., Sołjan, I., Liro, J. (2022). Polish geography and Polish geographers under Nazi occupation. Journal of Historical Geography, 75 1-13.
 Gross, M. H. (2013). Reclaiming the Nation: Polish Schooling in Exile during the Second World War. History of Education Quarterly, 53(3), 233–254. 
 Kornat, M. (2009). Choosing Not to Choose in 1939: Poland's Assessment of the Nazi-Soviet Pact. The International History Review, 31(4), 771–797. 
 Röger, M. (2014). The Sexual Policies and Sexual Realities of the German Occupiers in Poland in the Second World War. Contemporary European History, 23(1), 1–21.

Reference works
 Hayes, P., & Roth, J. K. (2011). The Oxford Handbook of Holocaust Studies. Oxford University Press.

English language primary sources
War
 Poland, Germany, and Danzig. (May 20, 1939). Bulletin of International News, Royal Institute of International Affairs; 16(10), 3–13. 
 Mr. Chamberlain's Review of the Danzig Question. (Jul. 15, 1939). Bulletin of International News, Royal Institute of International Affairs; 16(14), 11–12. 
 Danzig, Germany, and Poland. (Aug. 26, 1939). Bulletin of International News, Royal Institute of International Affairs; 16(17), 12–18. 
 Noakes, J., & Pridham, G. (Eds.). (2001). The German Occupation of Poland. In Nazism 1919–1945 Volume 3: Foreign Policy, War and Racial Extermination: A Documentary Reader (pp. 314–388). Liverpool University Press. 

Holocaust
 Katz, S. T. (1999). Documents on the Holocaust: Selected Sources on the Destruction of the Jews of Germany and Austria, Poland, and the Soviet Union (Y. Gutman, Y. Arad, & A. Margaliot, Eds.; L. B. Dor, Trans.; 8th edition). Lincoln: University of Nebraska Press.

Memoirs and diaries
 Browning, C. R., Hollander, R. S., & Tec, N. (Eds.). (2007). Every Day Lasts a Year: A Jewish Family's Correspondence from Poland. Cambridge: Cambridge University Press.
 Dembowski, P. (2015). Memoirs Red and White: Poland, the War, and After. Notre Dame: University of Notre Dame Press.
 Reicher, E., & Bizouard-Reicher, E. (2013). Country of Ash: A Jewish Doctor in Poland, 1939-1945 (M. Bogin, Trans.). New York: Bellevue Literary Press.

Academic journals

Further reading
The below works are published bibliographies about Poland during World War II.
 Okonski, W. (1997). Wartime Poland, 1939-1945: A Select Annotated Bibliography of Books in English. Westport: Greenwood Publishing Group.
 Peszke, M. A. (2006). An Introduction to English-Language Literature on the Polish Armed Forces in World War II. The Journal of Military History'', 70(4), 1029–1064.

See also
 Bibliography of Russian history
 Bibliography of the Soviet Union (disambiguation)
 Bibliography of Ukrainian history

References

Notes

Citations

External links
 National Bibliography of Poland;  International and Area Studies Library, University of Illinois. 
 The National Library of Poland

 
Poland World War II
Bibliographies of World War II